Worthing Rugby Football Club is an English rugby union team playing in the fourth tier of the English rugby union league system; National League 2 South. The first XV, nicknamed The Raiders, were runners-up to Henley Hawks in the National League 2 South 2012–13 season and qualified for a play-off against the runners-up of National League 2 North, Stourbridge winning 28 – 26. In doing so, the club became the first club from Sussex to play in the third tier of English rugby. The club also has a number of other teams, and while their 2nd XV is non-league, their 3rd XV currently plays in the Sussex Spitfire 1 league. Worthing also have a successful Ladies 1st XV who are currently in 2nd place in the National Challenge South East South 2 league

History
A group of local sportsmen meeting at York House formed the club on the 10 September 1920. They had no ground or equipment, and initially borrowed a field from a local farmer off Wallace Avenue in West Worthing before moving to the Rotary Ground at Broadwater. In the 1924–25 season the club moved to Rugby Road in West Worthing. The Rugby Road ground was the club's home until 1927, when a  site was purchased in Castle Road, West Tarring. The club moved to its current location at Roundstone Lane in Angmering in 1977 and the ground is now designated a Centre of Excellence for rugby in Sussex. Worthing has a proud history of mini and junior rugby, having been the first club in England to offer mini rugby and having held the first mini rugby festival in England which attracted hundreds of teams in the early 90s.

Current standings

Honours
1st team:
 London Division 3 East champions: 2001–02
 London Division 2 South champions: 2002–03
 London 1 v South West 1 promotion play-off winner: 2007–08
 National League 2 (north v south) promotion play-off winner: 2012–13

Worthing Senior I:
 Sussex Late Red 3 West champions: 2011–12
 Sussex 2 champions: 2013–14

Worthing Senior II:
 Sussex Late Red 3 West champions: 2012–13

Club colours
The original club colours were green and white stripes, which were also sported by Old Guilfordians RFC. The choice of the present royal blue with chocolate and gold hoops was made in 1927. The scheme is an amalgamation of the colours of Dulwich College, Mill Hill School and Cranleigh School where many of the team members had been to school.

Notable former players
  Joe Launchbury
  Joe Marler
  Martyn Elms - England U16s
  Semisi Taulava
  James Chisholm – England U20s
  Piers O'Conor – England U20s
  Harry Sloan – England U20s
  Amy Wilson-Hardy – Team GB Olympics Women's 7s 2016, England Women's 15s & 7s

Current squad
In July 2011, former Ireland international Kieron Dawson was appointed head coach of Worthing Rugby Football Club, succeeding Will Green. Charlie McGowan previously made an appearance for the Barbarians against the Combined Services at Plymouth in the annual Remembrance Match in November 2013. He has also been selected for the England Counties squad for their match against Scotland Club XV at Fylde’s Woodlands Memorial Ground on 27 February 2015. Matt Miles (ex Raiders captain) had previously played for Northampton Saints and Ulster before joining Worthing RFC. For the 2016 season, former Worthing RFC 1XV Coach and former Director of Rugby at Cornish Pirates Ian Davies rejoined the Raiders as Director of Rugby with former Raiders wing Ben Coulson and former Raiders Captain Jody Levett on the coaching staff.

References

External links
 Official website

English rugby union teams
Rugby clubs established in 1920
Rugby union in West Sussex
Sport in Worthing